The fourth season of The Real Housewives of Miami, an American reality television series, premiered on Peacock on December 16, 2021. The season was primarily filmed in Miami, Florida. Its executive producers are Matt Anderson, Nate Green, Cooper Green and Andy Cohen.

The season focuses on Guerdy Abraira, Alexia Nepola, Lisa Hochstein, Julia Lemigova, Nicole Martin and Larsa Pippen. Adriana De Moura, Marysol Patton and Kiki Barth are also featured in a recurring capacity.

Production and crew
In November 2020, The Real Housewives executive producer Andy Cohen said that there were talks to return the show for a fourth season on the streaming service Peacock. In February 2021, the series was confirmed to be making a return. Shortly after the announcement previous cast members Joanna Krupa and Lea Black both stated that they were not interested in appearing on the new season.

Cast
In October 2021, Peacock confirmed season 4 would premiere in December 2021 with returning housewives Alexia Nepola, Lisa Hochstein and Larsa Pippen being joined by Guerdy Abraira, Julia Lemigova and Nicole Martin. It was also announced that Adriana de Moura and Marysol Patton would return as friends of the housewives with Kiki Barth also joining as a friend.

 Patton is seated between Nepola and Pippen during her appearance at the reunion.
 de Moura is seated between Lemigova and Abraira during her appearance at the reunion.

Episodes

References

External links
 

 

The Real Housewives of Miami
2021 American television seasons
2022 American television seasons